This is a list of public holidays in Montserrat.

References

Montserrat
Montserratian culture
Montserrat